Woodstock Palace was a royal residence in the English town of Woodstock, Oxfordshire.

Henry I of England built a hunting lodge here and in 1129 he built  of walls to create the first enclosed park, where lions and leopards were kept. The lodge became a palace under Henry's grandson, Henry II, who spent time here with his mistress, Rosamund Clifford.

Timeline
Important events that took place at the palace or manor include:

 The marriage of William the Lion, king of Scots to Ermengarde de Beaumont in 1186
 The signing of the Treaty of Woodstock between Henry III of England and Llewelyn the Last (1247)
 The birth of Edmund of Woodstock, 1st Earl of Kent (1301-1330), the sixth son of King Edward I, and the second by his second wife Margaret of France, and a younger half-brother of King Edward II.
 The birth of Edward, the Black Prince (1330), eldest son and heir apparent of King Edward III and father of King Richard II.
 The marriage of Mary Plantagenet, daughter of King Edward III, to John IV, Duke of Brittany (1361)
 A lost play, the Necromancer or Nigramansir by John Skelton is said to have been performed at the palace for Henry VII on Palm Sunday, 1501.
 Imprisonment of the future Queen Elizabeth I of England (1554–58)

A chapel or oratory was built for Eleanor of Provence, the wife of Henry III, in 1250. The new chapel was dedicated to St Edward and located above the Queen's Chamber. Externally the chapel had crenellations.

Elizabeth I and the gatehouse
Henry VII rebuilt a part of the palace in the 1490s. The work was supervised by Master George Gainesford, and the mason was William Este. He built the gatehouse in 1507. Elizabeth I as Princess is said to have been lodged in the upper floors of the gatehouse in 1554, and scratched inscriptions on the palace windows with a diamond ring, and written on a shutter with charcoal. Her words were noted by the travellers Paul Hentzner and Henri, Duke of Rohan in 1600. A chamber in the gatehouse had an arched oak ceiling, with carving, painted blue with gilt decoration, and was later known as Queen Elizabeth's Chamber.

17th century
King James I and his wife Anne of Denmark, her secretary William Fowler, and Arbella Stuart came to Woodstock in September 1603 during a time of plague. Sir Robert Cecil criticised the building as, "unwholsome, all the house standing upon springs. It is unsavoury, for there is no savour but of cows and pigs. It is uneaseful, for only the King and Queen with the privy chamber ladies and 3 or 4 of Scottish council are lodged in the house". The court was at Woodstock again in September 1610.

In 1611, King James I gave Woodstock Palace to his son Henry Frederick, Prince of Wales, who had a banqueting house built of leafy tree branches in the park, in which he held a dinner for his parents and his sister Princess Elizabeth in August 1612. On 19 February 1617, Woodstock was given to Prince Charles.

In 1649, a survey was made of the manor buildings, mentioning, "a large gatehouse and a courtyard, on the north of which there is range of buildings called the Prince's Lodgings, on the east a spacious hall, adjoining to which there is a chapel and lodgings, known by the name of the Bishop's Lodgings, another courtyard called the Wardrobe, surrounded with the Lord Chamberlain's lodgings and wardrobe rooms, adjoining which is the Queen's Hall and the steward's lodgings. There is a fair staircase leading up to the Guard Chamber, to which joins the Presence Chamber, on the right hand of which is the King's withdrawing room, bedchamber and closet, on the right hand the Queen's lodgings". The rooms were then mostly empty of furnishings.

Woodstock Palace was mostly destroyed during the English Civil War.

Later history

In 1705, Parliament granted the royal manor and honour (i.e. feudal barony) of Woodstock to John Churchill, 1st Duke of Marlborough (1650–1722), in recognition of his victory over the French at the Battle of Blenheim on 13 August 1704. The manor was to be held in feudal tenure from Queen Anne in free socage by service of grand serjeanty "of presenting at Windsor Castle, on the anniversary of the battle, a standard bearing the fleur-de-lys of France". An inescutcheon "of the Honour and Manor of Woodstock" was further granted by royal warrant in 1722 as an augmentation of honour to his coat of arms and was borne at his funeral. By a further Royal Licence, 26 May 1817, the inescutcheon was added as an augmentation of honour to the arms of the Dukes of Marlborough, and is still borne by them today. The arms comprise a Cross of St George surmounted by the royal arms of France.

Blenheim Palace was built in the manor of Woodstock for the Duke as his new seat. Some stone from the old Palace was used. The ruins of the old palace or manor house of Woodstock were removed in 1723.

References

History of Oxfordshire
Palaces in England
Royal residences in the United Kingdom
Country houses in Oxfordshire
Former palaces in England
Norman architecture in England